The  is a monumental 18th-century public fountain, at 57-59 rue de Grenelle in the 7th arrondissement of Paris, France. It was executed by Edme Bouchardon, royal sculptor of King Louis XV (ruled 1715–1774), and opened in 1745. The fountain is huge and richly decorated, but it had only two water spouts, and its grand scale on the narrow street, together with the lack of water, irritated Voltaire and other figures of the French Enlightenment.

History 

The Fontaine des Quatre-Saisons was the largest and most ornate of the thirty fountains built in Paris in the 18th century to provide drinking water to the city's residents. Between 1715 and 1724, the Conseil d'Etat of King Louis XV began discussing the idea of a new fountain in the Faubourg Saint-Germain area, which was rapidly growing. They first discussed placing it at the corner of rue du Bac and the rue de l'Université, then rue Saint-Dominique, and finally decided on it current site on rue de Grenelle, on a parcel of land owned by the convent of Récollettes. The project was approved by the Prevot des Marchands, the leader of the city's businessmen, Michel-Étienne Turgot, who shared authority for all fountains and water projects in Paris, and was given in 1739 to the Royal sculptor, Edme Bouchardon, for completion. Bouchardon worked for seven years on the project. He displayed the plaster models for the central group of sculptures at the Salon du Louvre in 1740, and the bas-reliefs in 1741.  The fountain was not completely finished until 1745.

The fountain had a double purpose: to provide water to Parisians, and to advertise the benevolence of King Louis XV to the people of Paris. The King's principal minister and political counselor, the Cardinal de Fleury, personally wrote the inscription which was placed on the facade of the fountain, in Latin, in gold letters engraved in black marble:

While the fountain had an abundance of statuary, it did not produce very much water. Only one aqueduct brought water to the Left Bank at the time, the aqueduct de Arcueil, which brought water to the left bank from Rungis. The water flowed to the Fontaine Saint-Michel, then by a secondary pipe to the Fontaine des Quatre-Saisons. The water was stored in the upper part of the fountain, and flowed by gravity down to two spouts in form of lion's heads, from which water flowed continually. The water was collected in vessels by local residents, or by water porters (porteurs d'eau) who carried the water to other parts of the quarter and sold it to the inhabitants.

After the fountain was built, there were many calls for it to be moved to a large square where it would be more visible and proportional to its surroundings, but, given the many reconstructions of Paris squares in the 19th and 20th century, it probably survived intact only because of its obscure location.

Decoration 

The decorative figures of the fountain were described by Bouchardon himself in his proposal:

Critical reaction 

The sculpture by Bouchardon was widely praised at the time. It was featured, along with a fine engraving of the fountain,   in the article on classical sculpture by J. F. Blondel in the French Encyclopedia of 1765.

The project, however, and its massive scale on the narrow street, was criticized by Voltaire in a letter to the Count de Caylus in 1739, as the fountain was still under construction:

Gallery

Notes

References 
Paris et ses fontaines de la Renaissance à nos jours, from the Collection Paris et son Patrimoine, directed by Béatrice de Andia, Délégué Général à l'Action artistique de la Ville de Paris, 1998. (A collection of texts on the history of Paris fountains.)

External links
 

Fountains in Paris
Buildings and structures in the 7th arrondissement of Paris